NGC 606 is a barred spiral galaxy located in the Pisces constellation about 470 million light-years from the Milky Way. It was discovered by the French astronomer Édouard Stephan in 1881.

SN 2016fmt, a type II supernova, occurred in NGC 606.

See also 
 List of NGC objects (1–1000)

References

External links 
 

0606
Barred spiral galaxies
Pisces (constellation)
005874